Dörtbölük can refer to:

 Dörtbölük, Sason
 Dörtbölük, Sivrice